The Bishop Mountain Lookout, located in Island Park, Idaho, was created between 1936 and 1938 by the Civilian Conservation Corps (CCC) in the Caribou-Targhee National Forest. It was listed on the National Register of Historic Places in 1986, and its cabin is currently available as reserved accommodations through the United States Forest Service.

Background
Bishop Mountain Look was constructed between 1936 and 1938 by members of Company 2515 of the Civilian Conservation Corps (CCC), based at Camp Porcupine (F-405), as a fire lookout for the United States Forest Service in the Caribou-Targhee National Forest.

When Franklin D. Roosevelt first ran for the office of President of the United States, America was in the midst of The Great Depression, with economic recovery uncertain. Roosevelt campaigned in 1932 on the promise,  "I pledge you, I pledge myself, to a new deal for the American people." The CCC, which operated 1933–1942,  was part of his New Deal program, providing unskilled manual labor jobs related to the conservation and development of natural resources in rural lands owned by federal, state and local governments. In Idaho, the CCC, employed 80,000 men, a larger per capita ratio than any other state. 

The  steel construction fire lookout tower is topped by a steel cab manufactured by Aermotor Company of Chicago.

The log cabin was built as a 16'x24' one-room, screened-porch structure, with a "vault toilet" in a separate building. The cabin, which has no running water,  electricity, bed linens or other basic amenities, is currently available for rental through the National Forest Service. Much of the road access is paved with only gravel, and can only be accessed by snowmobile during many of the winter months.

NRHP certification

The property was added to the NRHP in Fremont County, Idaho on May 23, 1986.

Citations

Sources

External links

City of Island Park, Idaho official site
Idaho Historical Society

Fire lookout towers on the National Register of Historic Places in Idaho
Buildings and structures in Fremont County, Idaho
Civilian Conservation Corps in Idaho
National Register of Historic Places in Fremont County, Idaho